Kovas Kaunas was a Lithuanian football club from Kaunas. It was one of the best Lithuanian football clubs during interbellum.

History 

Club was founded as LFLS Kaunas (Lietuvos fizinio lavinimosi sąjunga – Lithuanian physical education union) department in Šančiai by Stasys Sabaliauskas. On March 11, 1923 it was renamed "Kovas". It has also played against Latvian, Estonian, Czechoslovakian, Austrian, Hungarian and other foreign teams. A. Pankratovas was the last chairman of the club. Kovas sports club also cultivated ice hockey, basketball, boxing, table-tennis and other sports. After Soviet occupation it was reformed to railwaymen team Lokomotyvas Kaunas.

Name history 
1921 – LFLS Šančiai
1923 – ŠŠ Kovas Kaunas

International games

Achievements 
Lithuanian Championship
Winners (6): 1924, 1925, 1926, 1933, 1935, 1936
Runners-up (4): 1922, 1931, 1936–1937, 1938–1939
Third places (1): 1923
 Final of Kooperacijos (Cooperation) Cup (1924)

External links 
Statistics – futbolinis.lt

Defunct football clubs in Lithuania
Football clubs in Kaunas
1921 establishments in Lithuania
1944 disestablishments in Lithuania
Association football clubs established in 1921
Association football clubs disestablished in 1944